Şahvələdli is a village in the Jabrayil District of Azerbaijan.

References

Populated places in Jabrayil District
Populated places in Azerbaijan